Siaka Bagayoko (born 24 July 1998) also known as Chato, is a Malian football defender for FC Mynai.

International career

International goals
Scores and results list Mali's goal tally first.

References

External links
 
 

1998 births
Living people
Malian footballers
Malian expatriate footballers
Mali international footballers
Mali youth international footballers
Djoliba AC players
Stade Malien players
Anagennisi Karditsa F.C. players
CS Sfaxien players
FC Mynai players
Tunisian Ligue Professionnelle 1 players
Ukrainian Premier League players
Association football defenders
Malian expatriate sportspeople in Greece
Malian expatriate sportspeople in Tunisia
Malian expatriate sportspeople in Ukraine
Expatriate footballers in Greece
Expatriate footballers in Tunisia
Expatriate footballers in Ukraine
21st-century Malian people
Mali A' international footballers
2020 African Nations Championship players